Sue Yuchan Maroroa (born 4 March 1991) is a chess player who holds the FIDE title of Woman International Master (WIM). She represented New Zealand in five Chess Olympiads and England at the 2014 Chess Olympiad.

Career
Maroroa started playing chess when she was 11 years old. She played at the Auckland Chess Club and was taught by local player Ian McNally. She later went on to play at the Papatoetoe and Howick-Pakuranga chess clubs as well. She represented New Zealand at the World Youth Chess Championship Under-14 girls division in Belfort, France in 2005, and Under-18 girls division in Vũng Tàu, Vietnam in 2008.

In 2006, she won the New Zealand Women's Chess Championship. In 2008, she became the first female player to win the New Zealand Junior Chess Championship, coming equal first to share the title with Mario Krstev and Andy Chen.

Maroroa was awarded the title of Woman Candidate Master (WCM) in 2005 for her result of 5/9 at the 34th Chess Olympiad in Calvià, Spain in 2004. In 2007, she was awarded the title of Woman FIDE Master (WFM) for her result of 6/9 at the 2007 Oceania Women's Zonal Chess Championship in Fiji. Her third-place finish, again scoring 6/9, at the 2009 Oceania Women's Zonal Chess Championship on the Gold Coast, Queensland earned her the Woman International Master (WIM) title. During this time Maroroa was playing club chess in London, and was for a number of years the strongest player at Hammersmith Chess Club in West London.

Maroroa represented New Zealand in the five Chess Olympiads from 2002 to 2012. Her best result was in 2010 when she scored 6/9, without loss, in the 39th Chess Olympiad in Khanty-Mansiysk, Russia.

Maroroa competed in the Oceania Women's Championships in Auckland 2005, Denarau 2007, Gold Coast 2009, and Queenstown 2012.

In October 2012 transferred chess federations to represent England. In 2014, she achieved an International Master norm in the Four Nations Chess League. Her performance included a win against Grandmaster Mark Hebden.

Personal life
Maroroa was born in Auckland, New Zealand to a Cook Islander father and a Chinese-Malaysian mother. Since 2010, Maroroa has been living in England. In June 2012, she married leading English Grandmaster Gawain Jones. She lives in Sheffield and plays rugby for Sheffield Ladies RUFC.

Notable games

 Sue Maroroa - Samuel Franklin, Sunningdale Open (2010), Sicilian Defence: Closed Variation (B23), 1-0

1. e4 c5 2. Nc3 g6 3. f4 Bg7 4. Nf3 Nc6 5. Bb5 Nd4 6. O-O Nh6 7. d3 O-O 8. f5 gxf5 9. Nxd4 cxd4 10. Nd5 e6 11. Qh5 exd5 12. Bxh6 Bxh6 13. Qxh6 Qb6 14. Qxb6 axb6 15. Rxf5 dxe4 16. dxe4 d6 17. Rd5 f5 18. Rxd4 Be6 19. Rxd6 Rxa2 20. Rxa2 Bxa2 21. e5 Rc8 22. e6 Kf8 23. c3 Ke7 24. Rxb6 Bxe6 25. Rxb7+ 1-0

References

External links

Sue Maroroa chess games at 365Chess.com
Sue Yuchan Maroroa chess games (2004-2007) at 365Chess.com

1991 births
Living people
Chess Woman International Masters
New Zealand female chess players
English chess players
Chess Olympiad competitors
People from Auckland
New Zealand people of Chinese descent
New Zealand sportspeople of Cook Island descent
New Zealand people of Malaysian descent